The Nile Hilton Incident ( Hadith Alnayl Hiylton) is a 2017 Swedish thriller film directed by Tarik Saleh. It was screened in the World Cinema Dramatic Competition section of the 2017 Sundance Film Festival. It was awarded the World Cinema Grand Jury Prize: Dramatic. The film discusses the corruption of Egyptian police before the 25 January Revolution. The plot is inspired by the murder of the Lebanese Arab singer Suzanne Tamim in Dubai in 2008. At the 53rd Guldbagge Awards, the film won five awards, including Best Film.

Cast
 Fares Fares as Noredin Mostafa
 Mari Malek as Salwa 
 Yasser Ali Maher as Kammal Mostafa 
 Ahmed Selim as Hatem Shafiq 
  as Gina 
 Mohamed Yousry as Momo
 Slimane Dazi as Green Eyed Man
 Hichem Yacoubi as Nagui 
 Ger Duany as Clinton

Reception
On review aggregator website Rotten Tomatoes, the film holds an approval rating of 91% based on 55 reviews, and an average rating of 7/10. On Metacritic, the film has a weighted average score of 70 out of 100, based on 8 critics, indicating "generally favorable reviews".

References

External links
 

2017 films
2017 crime thriller films
2010s Swedish films
2010s Arabic-language films
Swedish crime thriller films
Best Film Guldbagge Award winners
Films directed by Tarik Saleh
Films set in 2011
Films set in Cairo
Films about murder
Films about police corruption